Estreito may refer to the following places:

Brazil
 Estreito (Maranhão), a municipality in the State of Maranhão
 Estreito, Florianópolis, a neighbourhood of Florianópolis, State of Santa Catarina
 Estreito, Goiás, a district of the municipality of Jataí, State of Goiás

Portugal
 Estreito (Oleiros), a civil parish in the municipality of Oleiros
 Estreito da Calheta, a civil parish in the municipality of Calheta, Madeira
 Estreito de Câmara de Lobos, a civil parish in the municipality of Câmara de Lobos, Madeira